Ron Hewat is a Canadian former sportscaster and broadcast executive. 

Hewat was the colour commentator for the Toronto Maple Leafs radio broadcasts from 1966 to 1968, and play-by-play from 1968 to 1977, and 1980 to 1982. 

Hewat was also vice-president in charge of sales and marketing for Telemedia Broadcasting Systems, and former president of CKFH Radio. In 1999, he was named Senior Vice President, Sales of Starfire Technologies Inc. 

Hewat retired in 2010.

References

Living people
People from Toronto
Toronto Maple Leafs announcers
Year of birth missing (living people)